The men's 100 metres event at the 1994 World Junior Championships in Athletics was held in Lisbon, Portugal, at Estádio Universitário de Lisboa on 20 and 21 July.

Medalists

Results

Final
21 July
Wind: +1.2 m/s

Semifinals
21 July

Semifinal 1
Wind: +1.1 m/s

Semifinal 2
Wind: +0.8 m/s

Quarterfinals
20 July

Quarterfinal 1
Wind: +0.2 m/s

Quarterfinal 2
Wind: +1.6 m/s

Quarterfinal 3
Wind: +2.2 m/s

Quarterfinal 4
Wind: +1.3 m/s

Heats
20 July

Heat 1
Wind: +0.1 m/s

Heat 2
Wind: +0.3 m/s

Heat 3
Wind: +0.1 m/s

Heat 4
Wind: +2.8 m/s

Heat 5
Wind: +1.5 m/s

Heat 6
Wind: +1.7 m/s

Heat 7
Wind: +1.3 m/s

Heat 8
Wind: +1.5 m/s

Heat 9
Wind: +1.1 m/s

Participation
According to an unofficial count, 66 athletes from 50 countries participated in the event.

References

100 metres
100 metres at the World Athletics U20 Championships